The Rwandan Ambassador to Belgium is the official representative of the Government of Rwanda to the Government of Belgium he is concurrently accredited to the European Commission, the government in The Hague and the Holy See.

List of representatives

References 

Ambassadors of Rwanda to Belgium
Belgium
Rwanda